Little Wall Lake is a  natural lake in Hamilton County, Iowa,  south of the town of Jewell. Said to be glacial in origin, in modern times it has required dredging to keep it from becoming marshland. On the northern end of the lake is Little Wall Lake Park, run by the county, which has camping facilities with full utility hook-ups, three cabins for rent, sixteen tent-only sites, a shower building, a boat ramp, a jetty, and kayak and canoe rentals. On March 28, 2021, two members of the Iowa State University Crew Club drowned in the lake when their racing shell capsized.

References

Lakes of Iowa